The first season of the American science fiction horror drama television series Stranger Things premiered worldwide on the streaming service Netflix on July 15, 2016. The series was created by the Duffer Brothers, who also serve as executive producers along with Shawn Levy and Dan Cohen.

This season stars Winona Ryder, David Harbour, Finn Wolfhard, Millie Bobby Brown, Gaten Matarazzo, Caleb McLaughlin, Natalia Dyer, Charlie Heaton, Cara Buono, and Matthew Modine, with Noah Schnapp, Joe Keery, and Shannon Purser in recurring roles. The first season of Stranger Things received universal acclaim, in particular for its originality, homages to the 1980s, characterization, tone, visuals, and acting (particularly that of Ryder, Harbour, Wolfhard, Brown, and Modine).

Premise
The first season begins on November 6, 1983, in a small town called Hawkins. Researchers at Hawkins National Laboratory open a rift to the "Upside Down," an alternate dimension that reflects the real world. A monstrous humanoid creature (later nicknamed the Demogorgon) escapes and abducts a boy named Will Byers and a teenage girl named Barbara Holland. Will's mother, Joyce, and the town's police chief, Jim Hopper, search for Will. At the same time, a young psychokinetic girl who goes by the name "Eleven" escapes from the laboratory and assists Will's friends, Mike Wheeler, Dustin Henderson, and Lucas Sinclair, in their own efforts to find Will.

Cast and characters

Main cast
 Winona Ryder as Joyce Byers
 David Harbour as Jim Hopper
 Finn Wolfhard as Mike Wheeler
 Millie Bobby Brown as Eleven ("El")
 Gaten Matarazzo as Dustin Henderson
 Caleb McLaughlin as Lucas Sinclair
 Natalia Dyer as Nancy Wheeler
 Charlie Heaton as Jonathan Byers
 Cara Buono as Karen Wheeler
 Matthew Modine as Martin Brenner

Recurring
 Joe Keery as Steve Harrington
 Shannon Purser as Barbara "Barb" Holland
 Noah Schnapp  as Will Byers
 Joe Chrest as Ted Wheeler
 Ross Partridge as Lonnie Byers
 Rob Morgan as Officer Powell
 John Paul Reynolds as Officer Callahan
 Randy Havens as Scott Clarke
 Catherine Dyer as Connie Frazier
 Aimee Mullins as Terry Ives
 Amy Seimetz as Becky Ives
 Peyton Wich as Troy
 Tony Vaughn as Principal Coleman
 Charles Lawlor as Mr. Melvald 
 Tinsley and Anniston Price as Holly Wheeler
 Cade Jones as James
 Chester Rushing as Tommy H.
 Chelsea Talmadge as Carol
 Glennellen Anderson as Nicole
 Cynthia Barrett as Marsha Holland
 Jerri Tubbs as Diane Hopper
 Elle Graham as Sara Hopper
 Chris Sullivan as Benny Hammond
 Tobias Jelinek as lead agent
 Robert Walker-Branchaud as repairman agent
 Susan Shalhoub Larkin as Florence ("Flo")

Episodes

Production

Development

Stranger Things was created by Matt and Ross Duffer, known professionally as The Duffer Brothers. The two had completed writing and producing their 2015 film Hidden, which they had tried to emulate the style of M. Night Shyamalan, however, due to changes at Warner Bros., its distributor, the film did not see a wide release and the Duffers were unsure of their future. To their surprise, television producer Donald De Line approached them, impressed with Hiddens script, and offered them the opportunity to work on episodes of Wayward Pines alongside Shyamalan. The brothers were mentored by Shyamalan during the episode's production so that when they finished, they felt they were ready to produce their own television series.

The Duffer Brothers prepared a script that would essentially be similar to the series' actual pilot episode, along with a 20-page pitch book to help shop the series around for a network. They pitched the story to a number of cable networks, all of which rejected the script on the basis that they felt a plot centered around children as leading characters would not work, asking them to make it a children's show or to drop the children and focus on Hopper's investigation in the paranormal. In early 2015, Dan Cohen, the VP of 21 Laps Entertainment, brought the script to his colleague Shawn Levy. They subsequently invited The Duffer Brothers to their office and purchased the rights for the series, giving full authorship of it to the brothers. After reading the pilot, the streaming service Netflix purchased the whole season for an undisclosed amount; the show was subsequently announced for a planned 2016 release by Netflix in early April 2015. The Duffer Brothers stated that at the time they had pitched to Netflix, the service had already been recognized for its original programming, such as House of Cards and Orange Is the New Black, with well-recognized producers behind them, and were ready to start giving upcoming producers like them a chance. The brothers started to write out the series and brought Levy and Cohen in as executive producers to start casting and filming.

The series was originally known as Montauk, as the setting of the script was in Montauk, New York and nearby Long Beach locations. The brothers had chosen Montauk as it had further Spielberg ties with the film Jaws, where Montauk was used for the fictional setting of Amity Island. After deciding to change the narrative of the series to take place in the fictional town of Hawkins instead, the brothers felt they could now do things to the town, such as placing it under quarantine, that they really could not envision with a real location. With the change in location, they had to come up with a new title for the series under the direction from Netflix's Ted Sarandos so that they could start marketing it to the public. The brothers started by using a copy of Stephen King's Firestarter novel to consider the title's font and appearance and came up with a long list of potential alternatives. Stranger Things came about as it sounded similar to another King novel, Needful Things, though Matt noted they still had a "lot of heated arguments" over this final title.

Writing
The idea of Stranger Things started with how the brothers felt they could take the concept of the 2013 film Prisoners, detailing the moral struggles a father goes through when his daughter is kidnapped, and expand it out over eight or so hours in a serialized television approach. As they focused on the missing child aspect of the story, they wanted to introduce the idea of "childlike sensibilities" they could offer and toyed around with the idea of a monster that could consume humans. The brothers thought the combination of these things "was the best thing ever". To introduce this monster into the narrative, they considered "bizarre experiments we had read about taking place in the Cold War" such as Project MKUltra, which gave a way to ground the monster's existence in science rather than something spiritual. This also helped them to decide on using 1983 as the time period, as it was a year before the film Red Dawn came out, which focused on Cold War paranoia. Subsequently, they were able to use all their own personal inspirations from the 1980s, the decade they were born, as elements of the series, crafting it in the realm of science fiction and horror. The Duffer Brothers have cited as influence for the show (among others): Stephen King novels; films produced by Steven Spielberg, John Carpenter, Wes Craven, Robert Zemeckis, George Lucas and Guillermo del Toro; films such as Alien and Stand by Me; Japanese anime such as Akira and Elfen Lied; and video games such as Silent Hill and The Last of Us.

With Netflix as the platform, The Duffer Brothers were not limited to a typical 22-episode format, opting for the eight-episode approach. They had been concerned that a 22-episode season on broadcast television would be difficult to "tell a cinematic story" with that many episodes. Eight episodes allowed them to give time to characterization in addition to narrative development; if they had less time available, they would have had to remain committed to telling a horror film as soon as the monster was introduced and abandon the characterization. Within the eight episodes, the brothers aimed to make the first season "feel like a big movie" with all the major plot lines completed so that "the audience feels satisfied", but left enough unresolved to indicate "there's a bigger mythology, and there's a lot of dangling threads at the end", something that could be explored in further seasons if Netflix opted to create more.

Regarding writing for the children characters of the series, The Duffer Brothers considered themselves as outcasts from other students while in high school and thus found it easy to write for Mike and his friends, and particularly for Barb. Joyce was fashioned after Richard Dreyfuss's character Roy Neary in Close Encounters of the Third Kind, as she appears "absolutely bonkers" to everyone else as she tries to find Will. Other characters, such as Billy in the second season, have more villainous attributes that are not necessarily obvious from the onset; Matt explained that they took further inspiration from Stephen King for these characters, as King "always has really great human villains" that may be more malicious than the supernatural evil.

Casting

In June 2015, it was announced that Winona Ryder and David Harbour had joined the series as Joyce and as the unnamed chief of police, respectively. The brothers' casting director Carmen Cuba had suggested Ryder for the role of Joyce, which the two were immediately drawn to because of her predominance in 1980s films. Levy believed Ryder could "wretch up the emotional urgency and yet find layers and nuance and different sides of [Joyce]". Ryder praised that the show's multiple storylines required her to act for Joyce as "she's out of her mind, but she's actually kind of onto something", and that the producers had faith she could pull off the difficult role. The Duffer Brothers had been interested in Harbour before, who until Stranger Things primarily had smaller roles as villainous characters, and they felt that he had been "waiting too long for this opportunity" to play a lead, while Harbour himself was thrilled by the script and the chance to play "a broken, flawed, anti-hero character".

Additional casting followed two months later with Finn Wolfhard as Mike, Millie Bobby Brown in an undisclosed role, Gaten Matarazzo as Dustin, Caleb McLaughlin as Lucas, Natalia Dyer as Nancy, and Charlie Heaton as Jonathan. In September 2015, Cara Buono joined the cast as Karen, followed by Matthew Modine as Martin Brenner a month later. Additional cast who recur for the first season include Noah Schnapp as Will, Shannon Purser as Barbara "Barb" Holland, Joe Keery as Steve Harrington, and Ross Partridge as Lonnie, among others.

Actors auditioning for the children's roles read lines from Stand By Me. The Duffer Brothers estimated they went through about a thousand different child actors for the roles. They noted that Wolfhard was already "a movie buff" of the films from the 1980s period and easily filled the role, while they found Matarazzo's audition to be much more authentic than most of the other audition tapes, and selected him after a single viewing of his audition tape. As casting was started immediately after Netflix greenlit the show, and prior to the scripts being fully completed, this allowed some of the actors' takes on the roles to reflect into the script. The casting of the young actors for Will and his friends had been done just after the first script was completed, and subsequent scripts incorporated aspects from these actors. The brothers said Modine provided significant input on the character of Dr. Brenner, whom they had not really fleshed out before as they considered him the hardest character to write for given his limited appearances within the narrative.

Filming
The brothers had desired to film the series around the Long Island area to match the initial Montauk concept. However, with filming scheduled to take place in November 2015, it was difficult to shoot in Long Island in the cold weather, and the production started scouting locations in and around the Atlanta, Georgia area. The brothers, who grew up in North Carolina, found many places that reminded them of their own childhoods in that area, and felt the area would work well with the narrative shift to the fictional town of Hawkins, Indiana.

The filming of the first season began on September 25, 2015, and was extensively done in Atlanta, Georgia, with The Duffer Brothers and Levy handling the direction of individual episodes. Jackson served as the basis of the fictional town of Hawkins, Indiana. Other shooting locations included the Georgia Mental Health Institute as the Hawkins National Laboratory site, Bellwood Quarry, Patrick Henry High School in Stockbridge, Georgia, for the middle and high school scenes, Emory University's Continuing Education Department, the former city hall in Douglasville, Georgia, Georgia International Horse Park, the probate court in Butts County, Georgia, Old East Point Library and East Point First Baptist Church in East Point, Georgia, Fayetteville, Georgia, Stone Mountain Park, Palmetto, Georgia, and Winston, Georgia. Set work was done at Screen Gem Studios in Atlanta. The series was filmed with a Red Dragon digital camera. Filming for the first season concluded in early 2016.

While filming, the brothers tried to capture shots that could be seen as homages to many of the 1980s references they recalled. Their goal was not necessary to fill the work with these references, but instead to make the series seem to the viewer like a 1980s film. They spent little time reviewing those works and instead went by memory. Matt further recognized that some of their filming homages were not purposely done but were found to be very comparable, as highlighted by a fan-made video comparing the show to several 1980s works side by side. Matt commented on the video that "Some were deliberate and some were subconscious." The brothers recognized that many of the iconic scenes from these 1980s films, such as with Poltergeist, was about "taking a very ordinary object that people deal with every day, their television set, and imbuing it with something otherworldly", leading to the idea of using the Christmas light strings for Will to communicate with Joyce.

The brothers attributed much of the 1980s feel to set and costume designers and the soundtrack composers that helped to recreate the era for them. Lynda Reiss, the head of props, had about a $220,000 budget, similar to most films, to acquire artifacts of the 1980s, using eBay and searching through flea markets and estate sales around the Atlanta area. The bulk of the props were original items from the 1980s with only a few pieces, such as the Dungeons & Dragons books made as replicas.

Visual effects
To create the aged effect for the series, a film grain was added over the footage, which was captured by scanning in film stock from the 1980s. The Duffers wanted to scare the audience, but not to necessarily make the show violent or gory, following in line with how the 1980s Amblin Entertainment films drove the creation of the PG-13 movie rating. It was "much more about mood and atmosphere and suspense and dread than they are about gore", though they were not afraid to push into more scary elements, particularly towards the end of the first season. The brothers had wanted to avoid any computer-generated effects for the monster and other parts of the series and stay with practical effects. However, the six-month filming time left them little time to plan out and test practical effects rigs for some of the shots. They went with a middle ground of using constructed props including one for the monster whenever they could, but for other shots, such as when the monster bursts through a wall, they opted to use digital effects. Post-production on the first season was completed the week before it was released on Netflix.

The title sequence uses closeups of the letters in the Stranger Things title with a red tint against a black background as they slide into place within the title. The sequence was created by the studio Imaginary Forces, formerly part of R/GA, led by creative director Michelle Doughtey. Levy introduced the studio to The Duffer Brothers, who explained their vision of the 1980s-inspired show, which helped the studio to fix the concept the producers wanted. Later, but prior to filming, the producers sent Imaginary Forces the pilot script, the synth-heavy background music for the titles, as well as the various book covers from King and other authors that they had used to establish the title and imagery, and were looking for a similar approach for the show's titles, primarily using a typographical sequence. They took inspiration from several title sequences of works from the 1980s that were previously designed by Richard Greenberg under R/GA, such as Altered States and The Dead Zone. They also got input from Dan Perri, who worked on the title credits of several 1980s films. Various iterations included having letters vanish, to reflect the "missing" theme of the show, and having letters cast shadows on others, alluding to the mysteries, before settling into the sliding letters. The studio began working on the title sequence before filming and took about a month off during the filming process to let the producers get immersed in the show and come back with more input. Initially, they had been working with various fonts for the title and used close-ups of the best features of these fonts, but near the end the producers wanted to work with ITC Benguiat, requiring them to rework those shots. The final sequence is fully computer-generated, but they took inspiration from testing some practical effects, such as using Kodalith masks as would have been done in the 1980s, to develop the appropriate filters for the rendering software. The individual episode title cards used a "fly-through" approach, similar to the film Bullitt, which the producers had suggested to the studio.

Music

The Stranger Things original soundtrack was composed by Michael Stein and Kyle Dixon of the electronic band Survive. It makes extensive use of synthesizers in homage to 1980s artists and film composers including Jean-Michel Jarre, Tangerine Dream, Vangelis, Goblin, John Carpenter, Giorgio Moroder, and Fabio Frizzi.

According to Stein and Dixon, The Duffer Brothers had been fans of Survive's music, and used their song "Dirge" for the mock trailer that was used to sell the show to Netflix. Once the show was green-lit, the Duffers contacted Survive around July 2015 to ask if they were still doing music; the two provided the production team with dozens of songs from their band's past to gain their interest, helping to land them the role. Once aboard, the two worked with producers to select some of their older music to rework for the show, while developing new music, principally with character motifs. The two had been hired before the casting process, so their motif demos were used and played over the actors' audition tapes, aiding in the casting selection. The show's theme is based on an unused work Stein composed much earlier that ended up in the library of work they shared with the production staff, who thought that with some reworking would be good for the opening credits.

The first season's original soundtrack, consisting of 75 songs from Dixon and Stein split across two volumes, was released by Lakeshore Records. Digital release and streaming options were released on August 10 and 19, 2016 for the two volumes, respectively, while retail versions were available on September 16 and 23, 2016. 

In addition to original music, Stranger Things features period music from artists including The Clash, Toto, New Order, The Bangles, Foreigner, Echo and the Bunnymen, Peter Gabriel and Corey Hart, as well as excerpts from Tangerine Dream, John Carpenter and Vangelis. In particular, The Clash's "Should I Stay or Should I Go" was specifically picked to play at pivotal moments of the story, such as when Will is trying to communicate with Joyce from the Upside Down. Music supervisor Nora Felder felt the song "furthered the story" and called it an additional, unseen, main character of the season.

Release
The first season consisted of hour long episodes which were released worldwide on Netflix on July 15, 2016, in Ultra HD 4K and HDR.

Home media
The first season of Stranger Things was released on a Blu-ray/DVD combo pack exclusively to Target retailers on October 17, 2017, and the same for the 4K/Blu-ray combo pack on November 15, 2017, both of which includes vintage CBS-FOX VHS-inspired packaging.

Reception

Audience viewership
As Netflix does not reveal subscriber viewership numbers for any of their original series, Symphony Technology Group compiled data for the season based on people using software on their phones that measures television viewing by detecting a program's sound. According to Symphony, within the first 35 days of release, Stranger Things averaged ratings of around 14.07million adults between the ages of 18–49 in the United States. This made it the third most-watched season of Netflix original content in the U.S. at the time behind the first season of Fuller House and fourth season of Orange Is the New Black. In a September 2016 analysis, Netflix found that Stranger Things "hooked" viewers by the second episode of the first season, indicating that the second episode was "the first installment that led at least 70 percent of viewers who watched that episode to complete the entire first season of a show."

In August 2017, the marketing analytics firm Jumpshot determined the season was the seventh-most viewed Netflix season in the first 30 days after it premiered, garnering slightly more than 20% of the viewers that the second season of Daredevil received, which was the most viewed season according to Jumpstart. Jumpshot, which "analyzes click-stream data from an online panel of more than 100million consumers", looked at the viewing behavior and activity of the company's U.S. members, factoring in the relative number of U.S. Netflix viewers who watched at least one episode of the season.

Critical response
Review aggregator Rotten Tomatoes gave the first season an approval rating of 97% based on 91 reviews and a weighted average score of 8.2/10. The site's critical consensus states, "Exciting, heartbreaking, and sometimes scary, Stranger Things acts as an addictive homage to Spielberg films and vintage 1980s television." Review aggregator Metacritic gave the first season a normalized score of 76 out of 100 based on 34 reviews, indicating "generally favorable reviews".

IGN gave the score of 8 out of 10 and called the series "Great" saying, "Stranger Things is an easy recommendation, offering viewers an atmospheric and endearing series that is a nostalgic throwback without feeling like a simple copy." In a review of San Francisco Chronicle Dave Wiegand wrote: "Stranger Things reminds us of a time marked by a kind of no-strings escapism. And as it does so, we find ourselves yearning for it because the Duffers have made it so irresistibly appealing. There may be other equally great shows to watch this summer, but I guarantee you won't have more fun watching any of them than you will watching Stranger Things." Joshua Alston of The A.V. Club also reviewed it positively saying, "Balancing style and substance is always challenging for a series like Stranger Things, but the show is perfectly calibrated. It feels like watching a show produced during the era in which it's set, but with the craft of today's prestige television." Reviewing for HitFix, Alan Sepinwall said, "Over the course of the eight hours, the story and characters take on enough life of their own so that the references don't feel self-indulgent, and so that the series can be appreciated even if you don't know the plot of E.T. or the title font of Stephen King's early novels (a huge influence on the show's own opening credits) by heart."

Emily Nussbaum of The New Yorker also applauded the series and wrote, "This is astoundingly efficient storytelling, eight hours that pass in a blink, with even minor characters getting sharp dialogue, dark humor, or moments of pathos." Television critic Mary McNamara of Los Angeles Times said, "For the most part, and in absolute defiance of the odds, Stranger Things honors its source material in the best way possible: By telling a sweet 'n' scary story in which monsters are real but so are the transformative powers of love and fealty." The Wall Street Journals Brian Kelly said, "Matt Duffer and Ross Duffer, brothers and the show's creators, have done their homework when it comes to '80s cinema. Whether you're a fan of John Carpenter's The Thing or The Goonies is more your speed, there's plenty to like in Stranger Things." Angus McFadzean of Columbia University Press compared Stranger Things to The Goonies, Stand By Me, Russkies, and E.T. the Extra-Terrestrial.

Cultural impact

Shortly after its release, Stranger Things gained a dedicated fanbase. One area of focus from these fans was the character of Barb, the nerdy friend and classmate of Nancy who is taken and killed by the monster early in the season. According to actress Shannon Purser, Barb "wasn't supposed to be a big deal", and The Duffer Brothers had not gone into great detail about the character since the focus was on finding Will. However, many fans sympathized with the character, with Laura Bradley of Vanity Fair suggesting that these people found that Barb would be a similar misfit in society, and "looks more like someone you might actually meet in real life" compared to the other characters, particularly Nancy, in the series. A hashtag "#ImWithBarb" grew in popularity after the series' release, and several fan sites and forums were created to support her. While Purser will not return for the second season, The Duffer Brothers used the real-life "Justice for Barb" movement as inspiration for narrative at the start of the second season, with Nancy addressing the fact "that no one ever cares about" Barb. Purser and several media outlets took her nomination as Barb for Outstanding Guest Actress in a Drama Series in the 69th Primetime Emmy Awards as achieving "justice for Barb", highlighting how well her character was received.

Another impact of the series has been an increased demand for Eggo waffles, as they are shown to be Eleven's favorite food in several episodes and are seen as a representation of the show. The Kellogg Company, which manufactures Eggo, had not been part of the production prior to the first season's release but recognized the market impact of the series. It provided a vintage 1980s Eggo television advertisement for Netflix to use in its Super Bowl LI commercial, and is looking to become more involved with cross-promotion.

As part of its release on Netflix on April 14, 2017, the cast of the rebooted version of Mystery Science Theater 3000 riffed on the first part of "Chapter 1" of Stranger Things.

Accolades

References

External links
 
 

1
2016 American television seasons
Television series set in 1983